The Texas Rangers Major League Baseball team has played in Arlington, Texas, since 1972. The team began in 1961 as the Washington Senators, an American League expansion team based in Washington, D.C., before relocating to Texas. Since that time, over 1,100 players have competed in at least one game for the Senators/Rangers.



Key

A

Albert Abreu
Mike Adams
Nate Adcock
Jim Adduci
Darrel Akerfelds
José Alberro
Hanser Alberto
Doyle Alexander
Gerald Alexander
Manny Alexander
A. J. Alexy
Antonio Alfonseca
Luis Alicea
Brian Allard
Kolby Allard
Bernie Allen
Chad Allen
Hank Allen
Lloyd Allen
Carlos Almanzar
Sandy Alomar
Sandy Alomar Jr.
Darío Álvarez
Juan Alvarez
Wilson Álvarez
Brant Alyea
Drew Anderson
Jim Anderson
Scott Anderson
Elvis Andrus
Sherten Apostel
Danny Ardoin
J. P. Arencibia
Joaquín Árias
Kohei Arihara
Jack Armstrong
Brad Arnsberg
Tucker Ashford
Pedro Astacio
Doug Ault

B

Bob Babcock
Mike James Bacsik
Mike Joseph Bacsik
Scott Bailes
Harold Baines
Bob Baird
Jeff Baker
Scott Baker
Steve Balboni
Dave Baldwin
James Baldwin
Alan Bannister
Floyd Bannister
Rod Barajas
John Barfield
Len Barker
Joe Barlow
Tony Barnette
Steve Barr
Anthony Bass
Randy Bass
Rick Bauer
Lew Beasley
Kevin Belcher
Buddy Bell
Rob Bell
Carlos Beltrán
Adrián Beltré
Engel Beltré
Esteban Beltré
Omar Beltré
Alan Benes
Juan Beníquez
Wes Benjamin
Joaquín Benoit
Kris Benson
Lance Berkman
Frank Bertaina
Kurt Bevacqua
Jim Bibby
Austin Bibens-Dirkx
Jesse Biddle
Nick Bierbrodt
Larry Biittner
Dick Billings
Kyle Bird
Joe Bitker
Travis Blackley
Hank Blalock
Andrés Blanco
Kyle Blanks
Larvell Blanks
Don Blasingame
Bert Blyleven
Chet Boak
Terry Bogener
Brandon Boggs
Tommy Boggs
Brian Bohanon
Dan Boitano
Bobby Bonds
Lisalverto Bonilla
Julio Borbon
Thad Bosley
Dick Bosman
Jason Botts
Carl Bouldin
Sam Bowens
Oil Can Boyd
Milton Bradley
Mark Brandenburg
Jeff Brantley
Marv Breeding
Marshall Bridges
Harry Bright
Nelson Briles
Ed Brinkman
Pete Broberg
Doug Brocail
Jeff Bronkey
Jim Bronstad
Ben Broussard
Bob Brower
Adrian Brown
Jackie Brown
Kevin Brown
Kevin L. Brown
Larry Brown
Tom Brown
Jerry Browne
Cliff Brumbaugh
Duff Brumley
Mike Brumley
Glenn Brummer
George Brunet
Billy Bryan
Kevin Buckley
Steve Buechele
Damon Buford
Ryan Bukvich
Dave Burba
Brock Burke
John Burkett
Cory Burns
Todd Burns
Pete Burnside
Jeff Burroughs
Terry Burrows
Dave Bush
Matt Bush
John Butcher
Eddie Butler
Joey Butler
Marlon Byrd

C

Asdrúbal Cabrera
Greg Cadaret
Kole Calhoun
Willie Calhoun
Mickey Callaway
Doug Camilli
Ken Caminiti
Bert Campaneris
Mike Campbell
John Cangelosi
José Canseco
Jorge Cantú
Nick Capra
Leo Cárdenas
Cisco Carlos
Don Carman
Mike Carp
Cris Carpenter
David Carpenter
Rico Carty
Paul Casanova
Andrew Cashner
Don Castle
Fabio Castro
Frank Catalanotto
José Cecena
Domingo Cedeño
Juan Centeno
Dave Chalk
Bob Chance
Endy Chávez
Jesse Chavez
Bruce Chen
Tom Cheney
Scott Chiamparino
Robinson Chirinos
Michael Choice
Shin-Soo Choo
Ryan Christenson
Preston Claiborne
Jermaine Clark
Mark Clark
Terry Clark
Will Clark
Emmanuel Clase
Alex Claudio
Ken Clay
Royce Clayton
Reggie Cleveland
Gene Clines
Al Closter
David Clyde
Jim Coates
Kyle Cody
Frank Coggins
Joe Coleman
Bartolo Colón
Cris Colón
Steve Comer
Wayne Comer
Jason Conti
Dennis Cook
Glen Cook
Scott Coolbaugh
Alex Cora
Francisco Cordero
Bryan Corey
Carlos Corporán
Ed Correa
Chuck Cottier
Jharel Cotton
Neal Cotts
Casey Cox
Larry Cox
Tim Crabtree
Pete Craig
Keith Creel
Nelson Cruz
Víctor Cruz
Mike Cubbage
Darwin Cubillán
Bobby Cuellar
Charlie Culberson
Tim Cullen
Joe Cunningham
Chad Curtis
Zac Curtis
Milt Cuyler

D

David Dahl
Pete Daley
Bennie Daniels
Yu Darvish
Danny Darwin
Doug Dascenzo
Jack Daugherty
Butch Davis
Chris Davis
Doug R. Davis
Doug N. Davis
Khris Davis
Odie Davis
Willie Davis
Brett de Geus
David Dellucci
Ryan Dempster
Bill Denehy
Bucky Dent
Mark DeRosa
Delino DeShields Jr.
Ian Desmond
John Dettmer
Ross Detwiler
Mike Devereaux
Adrian Devine
Alex Diaz
Einar Díaz
Joselo Díaz
Mario Díaz
Víctor Díaz
R. A. Dickey
Jake Diekman
Derek Dietrich
Juan Dominguez
Dick Donovan
Ryan Dorow
Dutch Dotterer
Kyle Dowdy
Brian Downing
Kelly Dransfeldt
Ryan Drese
Steve Dreyer
Jim Driscoll
Rob Ducey
Justin Duchscherer
Jim Duckworth
Steven Duggar
Jan Dukes
Tom Dunbar
Dane Dunning
Steve Dunning
Dan Duran
Ezequiel Durán
Germán Duran
Ryne Duren
Don Durham
Sam Dyson

E

Adam Eaton
Jon Edwards
Dock Ellis
John Ellis
Robert Ellis
Jason Ellison
Kevin Elster
Cody Eppley
Mike Epstein
Scott Erickson
Paolo Espino
Cecil Espy
Demarcus Evans
Tom Evans
Carl Everett
Bryan Eversgerd
Willie Eyre

F

Bill Fahey
Peter Fairbanks
Héctor Fajardo
Rikkert Faneyte
Monty Fariss
Ed Farmer
Jim Farr
Luke Farrell
Jeff Fassero
Andrew Faulkner
Tim Federowicz
Ryan Feierabend
Scott Feldman
Neftalí Feliz
Frank Fernández
Tommy Field
Prince Fielder
Ed Figueroa
Pedro Figueroa
Steve Fireovid
Doug Fister
Scott Fletcher
Curt Flood
Randy Flores
Doug Flynn
Marv Foley
Mike Foltynewicz
Wilmer Font
Ted Ford
Logan Forsythe
Tony Fossas
Kevin Foster
Steve Foucault
Andy Fox
Eric Fox
Joe Foy
Frank Francisco
Julio Franco
Jeff Francoeur
Jason Frasor
Lou Frazier
Todd Frazier
Sam Freeman
Jim Fregosi
Jim French
Hanley Frias
Pepe Frías
Ernesto Frieri
Jeff Frye
Kyuji Fujikawa
Kazuo Fukumori
Brad Fullmer
Aaron Fultz

G

Kason Gabbard
John Gabler
Éric Gagné
Andrés Galarraga
Armando Galarraga
Yovani Gallardo
Joey Gallo
Oscar Gamble
Bárbaro Garbey
Adolis García
Leury García
Luis García
Mike Garcia
Reynaldo Garcia
Rosman García
Nick Gardewine
Ryan Garko
Mitch Garver
Matt Garza
Cory Gearrin
Dillon Gee
Craig Gentry
Estéban Germán
Franklyn Germán
Justin Germano
Ian Gibaut
Kyle Gibson
Jim Gideon
Benji Gil
Chris Gimenez
Doug Glanville
Jerry Don Gleaton
Ryan Glynn
Bill Gogolewski
Greg Golson
Carlos Gómez
Jeanmar Gómez
Rene Gonzales
Adrián González
Alberto González
Chi Chi Gonzalez
Juan González
Miguel González
Mike Gonzalez
Tom Goodwin
Nick Goody
Greg Goossen
Brian Gordon
Rich Gossage
Phil Gosselin
Gary Gray
Jon Gray
Dallas Green
Fred Green
Gary Green
Gene Green
Scarborough Green
Todd Greene
Rusty Greer
Tom Grieve
A. J. Griffin
Jason Grilli
Justin Grimm
Kevin Gross
Johnny Grubb
Kevin Gryboski
Joe Grzenda
Cecilio Guante
Eddie Guardado
Vladimir Guerrero
Taylor Guerrieri
Eric Gunderson
Cristian Guzmán
Freddy Guzmán
José Guzmán
Ronald Guzmán

H

Travis Hafner
Jerry Hairston Jr.
Drew Hall
Mark Hamburger
Cole Hamels
Darryl Hamilton
Josh Hamilton
Steve Hamilton
Ken Hamlin
Rich Hand
Bill Hands
Jim Hannan
Ron Hansen
Rich Harden
Shawn Hare
Steve Hargan
Mike Hargrove
Toby Harrah
Lucas Harrell
Bud Harrelson
Ken Harrelson
Donald Harris
Greg Harris
Vic Harris
Matt Harrison
Jason Hart
Mike Hart
Bill Haselman
Billy Hatcher
Mike Hauschild
Ray Hayward
Bill Haywood
Taylor Hearn
Jonah Heim
Scott Heineman
Roy Heiser
Woodie Held
Rick Helling
Ken Henderson
Tom Henke
Mike Henneman
Rick Henninger
Dwayne Henry
Gil Heredia
Wilson Heredia
Jimmy Herget
Elier Hernández
Jonathan Hernández
José Hernández
Luis Hernández
Rudy Hernández
Xavier Hernandez
Yonny Hernández
Joe Hicks
John Hicks
Richard Hidalgo
Dennis Higgins
Ken Hill
Chuck Hinton
Rich Hinton
Ed Hobaugh
Joe Hoerner
Guy Hoffman
Bryan Holaday
Derek Holland
Greg Holland
Todd Hollandsworth
Gary Holle
Gary Holman
Brock Holt
Rick Honeycutt
Burt Hooton
John Hoover
Sam Horn
Willie Horton
Dave Hostetler
Charlie Hough
Bruce Howard
Chris Howard
Frank Howard
Spencer Howard
Steve Howe
Jay Howell
Roy Howell
Jared Hoying
Wei-Chieh Huang
Mike Hubbard
Ken Huckaby
Charlie Hudson
Sam Huff
Travis Hughes
David Hulse
Bob Humphreys
Ken Hunt
Tommy Hunter
Eric Hurley
Bruce Hurst
James Hurst
Jeff Huson
Drew Hutchison
Adam Hyzdu

I

Andy Ibáñez
Pete Incaviglia
Hideki Irabu
Phil Irwin

J

Chuck Jackson
Luke Jackson
Chris James
Jerry Janeski
Mike Jeffcoat
Jeremy Jeffress
Ferguson Jenkins
Jack Jenkins
Jason Jennings
Marcus Jensen
Kevin Jepsen
A. J. Jiménez
D'Angelo Jiménez
Alex Johnson
Bob E. Johnson
Bob W. Johnson
Cliff Johnson
John Henry Johnson
Jonathan Johnson
Lamar Johnson
Andruw Jones
Bob Jones
Dalton Jones
Jason Jones
Odell Jones
Steve Jones
Brian Jordan
Mike Jorgensen
Mike Judd
Josh Jung
Ariel Jurado

K

Don Kainer
Gabe Kapler
Steve Karsay
Matt Kata
Mike Kekich
Keone Kela
Shawn Kelley
Roberto Kelly
Steve Kemp
Ian Kennedy
John Kennedy
Marty Keough
Jim Kern
Dallas Keuchel
Paul Kilgus
Isiah Kiner-Falefa
Hal King
Jim King
John King
Ian Kinsler
Willie Kirkland
Michael Kirkman
Ed Kirkpatrick
Billy Klaus
Phil Klein
Lou Klimchock
Ron Kline
Johnny Klippstein
Corey Kluber
Randy Knorr
Darold Knowles
Alan Koch
Danny Kolb
Howie Koplitz
John Koronka
Kevin Kouzmanoff
Ben Kozlowski
Pete Kozma
Jim Kremmel
Chad Kreuter
Frank Kreutzer
Ted Kubiak
Jeff Kunkel
Marty Kutyna

L

Bob Lacey
Al Lachowicz
Joe Lahoud
Gerald Laird
Mike Lamb
Hobie Landrith
Steve Lawson
Jake Latz
Rick Leach
Tim Leary
José Leclerc
Ricky Ledée
Carlos Lee
Cliff Lee
Corey Lee
Manuel Lee
Craig Lefferts
Charlie Leibrandt
Danilo León
Don Leppert
Al Levine
Dennis Lewallyn
Colby Lewis
Jim Leyritz
Paul Lindblad
Josh Lindblom
Dick Lines
Rick Lisi
Wes Littleton
Esteban Loaiza
Don Lock
Kameron Loe
Kenny Lofton
Kyle Lohse
Dale Long
Don Loun
Joe Lovitto
Derek Lowe
Mark Lowe
Nate Lowe
John Lowenstein
Mike Loynd
Jonathan Lucroy
Ryan Ludwick
Sparky Lyle
Jordan Lyles
Lance Lynn

M

Pete Mackanin
Elliott Maddox
Bill Madlock
Warner Madrigal
Héctor Maestri
Chris Magruder
Kevin Mahar
Ron Mahay
Greg Mahlberg
Mickey Mahler
Pat Mahomes
Jim Mahoney
Candy Maldonado
Bob Malloy
Brandon Mann
Ramón Mañón
Fred Manrique
Barry Manuel
Mike Marshall
Brett Martin
Chris Martin
Gene Martin
Jason Martin
Leonys Martín
Dave Martinez
Luis Martinez
Marty Martínez
Nick Martínez
John Marzano
Jim Mason
Mike Mason
Nick Masset
Rubén Mateo
Terry Mathews
Carl Mathias
Mark Mathias
Doug Mathis
Jeff Mathis
Jon Matlack
Gary Matthews Jr.
Rob Maurer
Dave May
Scott May
Lee Maye
Nomar Mazara
Lee Mazzilli
Joe McCabe
Larry McCall
Brandon McCarthy
Joe McClain
Kyle McClellan
Mike McCormick
Tommy McCraw
Lance McCullers
Daniel McCutchen
Jason McDonald
Marshall McDougall
Oddibe McDowell
Roger McDowell
Russ McGinnis
Chris McGuiness
Denny McLain
Joey McLaughlin
Mark McLemore
Ken McMullen
Craig McMurtry
Doc Medich
Dave Meier
Adam Melhuse
Kevin Mench
Román Méndez
Yohander Méndez
Luis Mendoza
Mario Mendoza
Orlando Mercado
Henry Mercedes
Mark Mercer
Ron Meridith
Jim Merritt
Travis Metcalf
Drew Meyer
Dan Miceli
Chris Michalak
Will Middlebrooks
Gary Mielke
Miles Mikolas
Jim Miles
Brad Miller
Eddie Miller
Shelby Miller
Tyson Miller
Kevin Millwood
Don Mincher
Mike Minor
Minnie Miñoso
Paul Mirabella
Doug Mirabelli
Dave Moates
Ron Moeller
Dale Mohorcic
Bengie Molina
Craig Monroe
Willie Montañez
Rafael Montero
Eric Moody
Barry Moore
Matt Moore
Tommy Moore
Mitch Moreland
Juan Moreno
Roger Moret
Mike Morgan
Guillermo Moscoso
Tony Mounce
Jamie Moyer
Mike Munoz
David Murphy
Donnie Murphy
A. J. Murray
Calvin Murray
Dale Murray
Aaron Myette

N

Mike Napoli
Sam Narron
Buster Narum
Joe Nathan
Cal Neeman
Dave Nelson
Gene Nelson
Jeff Nelson
Dick Nen
Robb Nen
Phil Nevin
Al Newman
Warren Newson
Juan Nicasio
Brett Nicholas
Chris Nichting
Dustin Nippert
C. J. Nitkowski
Ramón Nivar
Laynce Nix
Otis Nixon
Héctor Noesí
Dick Nold
Dickie Noles
Eric Nolte
Nelson Norman
Jim Norris
Edwin Núñez
Renato Núñez

O

Pete O'Brien
Danny O'Connell
Darren O'Day
Rougned Odor
Alexi Ogando
Ross Ohlendorf
Miguel Ojeda
Al Oliver
Darren Oliver
Mike Olt
Tom O'Malley
John Orsino
Phil Ortega
Héctor Ortiz
Joe Ortiz
Junior Ortiz
Luis Ortiz
Bobo Osborne
Claude Osteen
Roy Oswalt
Akinori Otsuka
Glenn Otto

P

Tom Paciorek
Vicente Padilla
Mike Pagliarulo
Rafael Palmeiro
Joe Palumbo
Dean Palmer
Jim Panther
Ken Pape
Mark Parent
Chan-ho Park
Larry Parrish
Camilo Pascual
Bob Patterson
Danny Patterson
Spencer Patton
Mike Paul
Roger Pavlik
Pedro Payano
Carlos Peguero
C. D. Pelham
Dan Peltier
Carlos Peña
Hunter Pence
Carlos Pérez
Martín Pérez
Matt Perisho
Gaylord Perry
Herbert Perry
Stan Perzanowski
DJ Peters
Cap Peterson
Fritz Peterson
Mark Petkovsek
Geno Petralli
Gary Pettis
Dick Phillips
Jimmy Piersall
A. J. Pierzynski
Stolmy Pimentel
Horacio Piña
Kevin Plawecki
John Poloni
Sidney Ponson
Jim Poole
Tom Poquette
Aaron Poreda
Bo Porter
Darrell Porter
Jay Powell
Yohel Pozo
Bob Priddy
Jurickson Profar
Ron Pruitt
Greg Pryor
Luis Pujols
Pat Putnam

Q

Omar Quintanilla
Art Quirk
Guillermo Quiróz

R

Cole Ragans
Tom Ragland
Dave Rajsich
Elizardo Ramírez
Erasmo Ramirez
Max Ramírez
Cesar Ramos
Mario Ramos
Pedro Ramos
Anthony Ranaudo
Lenny Randle
Clay Rapada
Chris Ray
Gary Redus
Rick Reed
Rob Refsnyder
Nick Regilio
Rick Reichardt
Kevin Reimer
Zach Reks
Desi Relaford
Ken Retzer
Dennys Reyes
John Rheinecker
Arthur Rhodes
Garrett Richards
Kevin Richardson
Mike Richardt
Pete Richert
Denny Riddleberger
Steve Ridzik
Matt Riley
Alex Ríos
Billy Ripken
Ray Rippelmeyer
Rubén Rivera
Yadiel Rivera
Mickey Rivers
Dave Roberts
Leon Roberts
Ryan Roberts
Dan Robertson
Drew Robinson
Jeff Robinson
Tom Robson
John Rocker
Alex Rodriguez
Aurelio Rodríguez
Guilder Rodríguez
Iván Rodríguez
Joely Rodríguez
Ricardo A. Rodríguez
Ricardo J. Rodríguez
Rich Rodríguez
Wandy Rodríguez
Yerry Rodríguez
Ed Roebuck
Kenny Rogers
Jim Roland
Jason Romano
Andrew Romine
Adam Rosales
Johnny Roseboro
Wayne Rosenthal
Seth Rosin
Robbie Ross
Tyson Ross
Michael Roth
Ben Rowen
Dave Rozema
Ryan Rua
Don Rudolph
Justin Ruggiano
Josh Rupe
Jeff Russell
John Russell
Nolan Ryan

S

Donnie Sadler
Connor Sadzeck
Marc Sagmoen
Jarrod Saltalamacchia
Billy Sample
Adrian Sampson
Danny Santana
Dennis Santana
Julio Santana
Víctor Santos
Luis Sardiñas
Rob Sasser
Joe Saunders
Bob Saverine
Josh Sborz
Johnny Schaive
Richie Scheinblum
Tanner Scheppers
Calvin Schiraldi
Bob Schmidt
Dave Schmidt
Gerry Schoen
Mike Schooler
Donnie Scott
Tony Scruggs
Corey Seager
Rudy Seánez
Bob Sebra
Larry See
David Segui
Diego Seguí
Aaron Sele
Marcus Semien
Jon Shave
Scott Sheldon
Jim Shellenback
Chris Shelton
Barry Shetrone
Brian Shouse
Sonny Siebert
Rubén Sierra
Roy Sievers
Brian Sikorski
Dave Silvestri
Mike Simms
Duke Sims
Bill Singer
Dave Sisler
Craig Skok
Bill "Moose" Skowron
Don Slaught
Roy Smalley
J. D. Smart
Dan Smith
Dick Smith
Josh Smith
Keith Smith
Mike Smithson
Justin Smoak
Jake Smolinski
Drew Smyly
Ryan Snare
Brad Snyder
Brandon Snyder
Nick Snyder
Eric Soderholm
Nick Solak
Joakim Soria
Alfonso Soriano
Sammy Sosa
Geovany Soto
Jim Spencer
Shane Spencer
Jeffrey Springs
Locke St. John
Matt Stairs
Jason Standridge
Don Stanhouse
Mike Stanley
Mike Stanton
Rusty Staub
Jim Steels
Bill Stein
Rick Stelmaszek
Dave Stenhouse
Ray Stephens
Lee Stevens
R. C. Stevens
Chris Stewart
Dave Stewart
Kurt Stillwell
Ron Stillwell
Jeff Stone
Todd Stottlemyre
Doug Strange
Ryan Strausborger
Pedro Strop
Ed Stroud
Drew Stubbs
Tom Sturdivant
Tanyon Sturtze
Ken Suárez
Dick Such
Bill Sudakis
Jim Sundberg
Rick Surhoff

T

Greg Tabor
Frank Tanana
Willie Tasby
Yoshinori Tateyama
Fernando Tatís
Leody Taveras
Scott Taylor
Taylor Teagarden
Mark Teixeira
Anderson Tejeda
Robinson Tejeda
Michael Tejera
Anthony Telford
Tomás Telis
Nick Tepesch
Jeff Terpko
Curtis Terry
Mickey Tettleton
Bob Tewksbury
Marcus Thames
Stan Thomas
Bobby Thompson
Bubba Thompson
Danny Thompson
Justin Thompson
Mike Thompson
John Thomson
Dickie Thon
Jesús Tinoco
Dave Tobik
Mason Tobin
Carlos Tocci
Shawn Tolleson
Wayne Tolleson
Brett Tomko
Yorvit Torrealba
Andrés Torres
César Tovar
Matt Treanor
Chris Tremie
Jose Trevino
Ryan Tucker

U

Koji Uehara
Jim Umbarger
Del Unser
Ugueth Urbina

V

Pedro Valdés
Ismael Valdéz
Merkin Valdez
Phillips Valdez
Ellis Valentine
Fred Valentine
Dave Valle
Todd Van Poppel
Ed Vande Berg
De Wayne Vaughn
Ramón Vázquez
Coot Veal
Randy Velarde
Will Venable
Mike Venafro
Logan Verrett
Zoilo Versalles
Brandon Villafuerte
Meibrys Viloria
Omar Vizquel
Jack Voigt
Edinson Vólquez
Ed Vosberg

W

Mark Wagner
Rick Waits
Duane Walker
Steele Walker
Mike Wallace
Denny Walling
Danny Walton
Gary Ward
John Wasdin
Claudell Washington
La Rue Washington
B. J. Waszgis
Kip Wells
Chris Welsh
Don Werner
Don Wert
Matt West
John Wetteland
Bill White
Eli White
Len Whitehouse
Matt Whiteside
Tom Wilhelmsen
Brad Wilkerson
Curtis Wilkerson
Nick Willhite
Jerome Williams
Matt Williams
Mitch Williams
Bump Wills
Paul Wilmet
Bobby Wilson
C. J. Wilson
Josh Wilson
Steve Wilson
Patrick Wisdom
Bobby Witt
Ross Wolf
Hunter Wood
Mike Wood
Steve Woodard
Hal Woodeshick
Gene Woodling
Craig Worthington
Clyde Wright
George Wright
Jamey Wright
Ricky Wright

X

Y

Esteban Yan
Yang Hyeon-jong
Ned Yost
Chris Young
Eric Young
Michael Young

Z

Gregg Zaun
Todd Zeile
Don Zimmer
Jeff Zimmerman
Bud Zipfel
Richie Zisk

References
Specific

General

Roster
Major League Baseball all-time rosters